Osvaldo Pedro Capemba (born 10 January 2002), commonly known as Capita, is an Angolan professional footballer who plays as an attacking midfielder for Liga Portugal 2 club Estrela da Amadora and the Angola national team.

International career
Capita made his debut for Angola national team on 12 November 2021 in a World Cup qualifier against Egypt.

Career statistics

Club

References

2002 births
Living people
Angolan footballers
Angola youth international footballers
Angola international footballers
Angolan expatriate footballers
Association football forwards
C.D. Primeiro de Agosto players
C.D. Trofense players
Lille OSC players
Royal Excel Mouscron players
C.F. Estrela da Amadora players
Campeonato de Portugal (league) players
Championnat National 3 players
Belgian Pro League players
Liga Portugal 2 players
Angolan expatriate sportspeople in Portugal
Expatriate footballers in Portugal
Angolan expatriate sportspeople in France
Expatriate footballers in France
Angolan expatriate sportspeople in Belgium
Expatriate footballers in Belgium